Chorizo de Bilbao, also known as Chorizo Bilbao, is a type of Filipino pork and beef dry sausage. It was originally produced by Vicente Genato of the Genato Commercial Corporation in Manila and the name is a genericized trademark originating from the branding coined by Genato from his family's original home city of Bilbao, Spain.

Today, most of the production has shifted to the American company Marca El Rey, who copied the branding. The sausages are popular among Filipino American communities in the United States and the Philippines. The ingredients of Chorizo de Bilbao is mostly identical to other unsweet Filipino longganisas, except for the addition of paprika and the dry and fine texture similar to pepperoni.

See also
Chorizo de Macao
 List of sausages

References

Philippine sausages